Souren Barseghyan (born 12 October 1959) is an Armenian association football manager, born in Yerevan, who managed the Armenia national team during UEFA Euro 2000 qualifying in 1998-99. He was the head coach of Mika Yerevan. Barseghyan also managed FC Kotayk Abovian in the Soviet First League and several Armenian Premier League clubs like Gandzasar Kapan, Ulisses and Mika Yerevan in the past.

References

External links
Profile at KLISF

1959 births
Living people
Sportspeople from Yerevan
Armenian football managers
Armenia national football team managers
Ulisses FC managers
FC Mika managers
Soviet Armenians